Vishnu Pandya is a journalist, biographer, poet, novelist, writer and political analyst from Gujarat, India. He has been the chairman of Gujarat Sahitya Akademi since 2017. Pandya writes articles on politics, history and historical places which are carried by several Gujarati newspapers and magazines, are among the most widely read columns in the State. He has been active in journalism for the last 40 years. Along with column writing in a Gujarati daily, he serves as General Secretary of Vishwa Gujarati Samaj.

Early life
Pandya was born in Manavadar in Junagadh State (now in Junagadh district of Gujarat). He was educated at Bahauddin College, Junagadh. His father had worked in South Africa before his return to India after World War II. He was the District officer – Education in Manavadar.

He married Arti Pandya. She died on 24 January 2018.

Career
Pandya started his career with Sadhana weekly, later became an editor of it at the age of 22. He was honored by the All Indian Newspapers Editor for  protest on censorship during the Indian Emergency. He managed to publish the magazine and wrote against the censorship. He was appointed the chairman of the Gujarat Sahitya Akademi in May 2017.

Pandya as a Journalist :
 Sub Editor : Jansatta-Loksatta (Indian Express Group, Gujarat) 1981–1987
 Editor : Rangtarang-Chandni (Indian Express Group, Gujarat) 1981–1987
 Editor : Sadhana Magazine 1967–1980
 Editor : Samantar Magazine from 1987
 Editor : BIradar Patrika 1986–87
 Bureau chief  : Nav Gujarat Times (Gujarati Daily Newspaper) 1994–1997
 Bureau chief : Dainik Mahanagar, Mumbai from 1996
 Columnist : Times of India (Gujarati Edition, 1992–93), Sandesh and Divyabhaskar

Pandya as a Lecturer

Pandya is teaching journalism in various colleges and universities of Gujarat at post graduate level, namely :
 Bhavan's College of Ahmedabad
 Bhavanagar University
 South Gujarat University
 Gujarat University
 Gujarat Vidhyapith
 Member of Board of Studies at M.S.University
 Gardi Vidhyapith
 National Institute of Mass Communication and Journalism

Writing
His writing has various subjects from political criticism and analytic to history research. He has written many biographies. Apart from these writings he is actively contributing to journalism, having written many books on the field of journalism. To this date he has written 101 books.

Books
Books on Journalism
 Patrakaratva no Itihas
 Patrakartvani Vikasrekha
 Patrakartvana Pravaho
 Kalamna Sipahi
 Patrakartva Dasha ane Disha
 Akhabarnu Sampadan
 PAtrakartva ane Kanun
 Chandarvo 1–2
 Sahitya Dainandini
 Gujaratnu Swatrantrottar Patrakartva (Fellowship from Dr. Chaturvedi University, Bhopal)

Criticism on Political Issues
 Bhaarelo Agni
 Seema Par Savdhan
 Sarhadni Salagti Samshyao
 Raktranjit Punjab
 Algavni Aandhi
 Rajkiya Zanzavati Varsho
 Gujaratni Chutani Shantranj 1952–2001
 Tasveer-e-Gujarat
 Samayna Hastakshar
 Swarnim Gujaratna Pachash Varsh
 Gandhiji ane Bharat Vibhajan

Biographies
 Rastrayagnana Rutvij
 Lala Hardayal
 Bhagvati Charan Varma
 M.N.Roy
 Jeevan Sadhakni Vimalyatra
 Syamji Krishnavarma
 Pandit Dindayal Upadhyay

History Research
 Londonma 'Indian Sociologist' 
 Rang De Basanti Chola
 Gujaratna Sasatra Swatrantjangno Itihas
 Pandit Shyamji Krishnavarma
 Gujaratna Kranti Tirtho
 Jaihind! Jaihind!
 Ma, Tuje Pranam!
 Viplavma Gujarat
 Shahid katha
 Gujarat: 1857
 Sattavanthi Subhash

Essays
 Shahmrug ane Devnama
 Vasant ane Ihamrug
 Padchinhopar Pachhavalta
 Hathelinu Aakash

Recognition

Pandya was imprisoned during Indian emergency of 1975–76. At that time his first book, Haheli nu Aakash (હથેળીનું આકાશ), was appreciated by the Gujarat Government and won a prize, but Pandya did not accept the prize. He received Narmad Suvarna Chandrak from Narmada Sahitya Sabha for historical writing in 1991. He was awarded Padma Shri in 2017 for literature  and history. In 2019, he was awarded a D.Lit. by Gujarat University.

References

1945 births
Living people
Indian male journalists
Indian male poets
Indian male novelists
20th-century Indian historians
People from Junagadh district
Writers from Gujarat
Recipients of the Padma Shri in literature & education
20th-century Indian male writers